Anthony Jamar Brown (born October 22, 1981) is an American urban contemporary gospel artist and musician, whose background singers are called Group Therapy, stylized group therAPy. He started his music career, in 2012, with the release of, Anthony Brown & Group TherAPy, by Tyscot Records. This was a Billboard breakthrough release, with chartings The Billboard 200, the Top Gospel Albums, and the Independent Albums chart. He is the worship leader at First Baptist Church of Glenarden, located in Upper Marlboro, Maryland, where he has served since June 2008.

Early life
Brown was born on October 22, 1981, as Anthony Jamar Brown, who considers his hometown to be Baltimore, Maryland. In 2008, he became Assistant Minister of Music at First Baptist Church of Glenarden, located in Upper Marlboro, Maryland and later worship leader.

Music career
His music career got started in 2012, with the release of Anthony Brown & Group TherAPy, that released on August 21, 2012, by Tyscot Records. It was produced by Brown and Justin Savage. The album was the breakthrough release on the Billboard charts, having placements at No. 130 on The Billboard 200, No. 3 on the Gospel Albums, and at No. 19 on the Independent Albums chart. Andy Kellman, specifying in a review by AllMusic, recognizes, "Brown puts his vocal-arrangement chops on full display throughout this contemporary gospel set, which bursts with uplifting spirit." Peggy Oliver, indicating in a highly recommended review at Soul Tracks, realizes, "Brown & group therAPy’s debut still invokes a fresh and joyous spirit." The capitalized AP, references his former group, Answered Prayers.

Members
 Group TherAPy
 Ashia Bello
 Shirley Daley
 Jamarice Daughtry
 Michelle Thompson
 Martellies Warren
 Nicole Wilson
 Mashica Winslow
 Doretha Sampson
 Gabriel Hansborough

Discography

References

External links
 Official website

Recent News

Just recently(March 30, 2018),Anthony Brown and Group therAPy took part in a concert entitled Harvest Praise in Ghana at Trade Fair,Fantasy Dome. It was an amazing performance.

1981 births
Living people
African-American songwriters
African-American Christians
Musicians from Baltimore
Songwriters from Maryland
21st-century African-American people
20th-century African-American people